Ninh Hòa Base is a former Republic of Korea Army base north of Nha Trang in Khánh Hòa Province, Vietnam.

History
The base remained in use by the 9th Division until their departure from Vietnam in March 1973.

Other units stationed at Ninh Hòa at various times included:
48th Assault Helicopter Company, Blue Star

Current use
The base is abandoned and has been turned over to housing and farmland.

References

Installations of the United States Army in South Vietnam
Army installations of the Republic of Korea
Buildings and structures in Khánh Hòa province